Intelsat 27 was an American communications satellite which was to have been operated by Intelsat. Intended as a replacement for Intelsat 805, it was destroyed after the rocket carrying it to orbit fell into the Pacific Ocean 56 seconds after launch.

Design
Based on the Boeing 702MP satellite bus, Intelsat 27 was designed to provide fifteen or more years of service to Intelsat customers in North America, South America, the Atlantic Ocean region and Europe. Originally intended for the United States Navy, the UHF payload was to have been leased to the government of Italy following the US Department of Defense withdrawing. The satellite would have been positioned at 55.5° West in geostationary orbit, co-located with Intelsat 805 and Galaxy 11.

Launch
Sea Launch were contracted to launch Intelsat 27, using a Zenit-3SL carrier rocket flying from the Odyssey platform anchored in the Pacific Ocean. The rocket lifted off from Odyssey at 06:56 UTC on February 1, 2013, however shortly afterwards Sea Launch issued a statement that the launch failed "approximately 40 seconds after liftoff", during first stage flight. Initial indications are that the rocket's first stage engine was intentionally shut down after the vehicle went out of control. Intelsat stated that they were "clearly disappointed with the outcome of the launch".

Sea Launch's Failure Review Oversight Board (FROB) found that the problem was in the hydraulic power supply unit in the Zenit-3SL's first stage.

See also

 2013 in spaceflight
 Intelsat 708
 NSS-8

References 

Satellites using the BSS-702 bus
Spacecraft launched in 2013
Intelsat satellites
Satellite launch failures